Sloane House at 149 Old Church Street is a Grade II listed late 18th-century house in Chelsea, London.

Notable residents
Leslie Rowan, civil servant
Ely Calil
Anthony Bamford

References

Houses completed in the 18th century
Grade II listed houses in the Royal Borough of Kensington and Chelsea
Chelsea, London